Pensacola FC is an American professional soccer team based in Pensacola, Florida the men's side competes in the National Premier Soccer League and the women's side competes in the Women's Premier Soccer League. It formerly played in the Gulf Coast Premier League.

History
The team was founded in 2013 and competed in the National Premier Soccer League. They were part of the Gulf Coast Texans organization, which also included a team in the Women's Premier Soccer League and youth teams. In 2013, the team announced it would end its partnership with the Texans and adopt a new name, Pensacola City FC.

The team announced on May 29, 2014, they were folding and would not complete the 2014 NPSL season. In 2015 a team would compete in the Super-20 League for one season (the league was dissolved), missing the league playoffs.

The club returned for the 2017 Gulf Coast Premier League for its first summer season.

In December 2017 the team announced it was rebranding as Pensacola Football Club.

Year-by-year

Head coaches
 Dean Logan (2022) NPSL
 Alex Guyer (2022) GCPL
 Dean Logan (2021) NPSL
 Alex Guyer (2021) GCPL
 Dean Logan (2019)
 Nolan Intermoia (2018)
 Nick Cardosa (2017) 
 Gary Hindley (2014)
 Felipe Lawall (2013)

Stadium
 Ashton Brosnaham Stadium; Pensacola (2013–present)
 Training facility at Legion Field (corner of "G" Street and Gregory); Pensacola, FL (2014–present)

Players
Goalkeepers: Jules Dechert, O'neil Lewis
Defenders: Jordi Ramon, Carson Hickok, Samuel Richards, Sean Reynolds, Isaac Machado, Keegan Lynch
Midfielders: Edward Chappe, Michael Lightbourne, Benardo Torres
Attackers: Jabari Hylton, Kai Phillip, Jayce Doston, Prince Owusu, Dillon Gallet, Kristoff Young

References

Pensacola FC Instagram

External links
 Official website
 Twitter

National Premier Soccer League teams
Sports in Pensacola, Florida
2013 establishments in Florida
Association football clubs established in 2013